Fabrice Simon (January 29, 1951 - July 29, 1998) was a Haitian-American abstract artist and fashion designer, best known for his handmade beaded party dresses that were popular during the 1980s.

Simon emigrated to America in 1964, and subsequently attended the Fashion Institute of Technology. He won a special Coty Award in 1981. His clientele included many celebrities, among them socialite Cornelia Guest and singer-actress Whitney Houston.

Death
On July 29, 1998, Simon died of AIDS in New York City at the age of 47.

References

External links

1951 births
1998 deaths
20th-century American businesspeople
20th-century American painters
Abstract painters
AIDS-related deaths in New York (state)
American company founders
American fashion businesspeople
American fashion designers
American male painters
American contemporary painters
American people of Haitian descent
Fashion Institute of Technology alumni
Haitian fashion designers
Haitian male painters
High fashion brands
People from Port-au-Prince
20th-century American male artists